The 1961 Italian Grand Prix was a Formula One motor race held on 10 September 1961 at Monza. It was race 7 of 8 in both the 1961 World Championship of Drivers and the 1961 International Cup for Formula One Manufacturers.

The race was marked by one of the most terrible accidents in the history of Formula One, when on the end of lap 2, at the approach to the Parabolica, German driver Wolfgang von Trips lost control of his Ferrari after colliding with the Lotus of Jim Clark and crashed into a fence line of spectators, killing 15 and himself. The race was not stopped, allegedly to avoid the audience going home en masse jamming the roads around the stadium and thus impeding the rescue work for the injured. This was also the last Formula One race ever to be held on the full  Monza circuit, with the two banked corners and the straight between the bankings included.

The race was won by von Trips's American teammate Phil Hill; since von Trips was the only one who could challenge him, Hill won the World Championship with one race to go. Hill's Monza win also assured Ferrari of the Constructors' Championship for 1961.

Background 
Before the running of the 1961 Italian Grand Prix, four drivers were mathematically in contention for the year's Drivers' Championship: Wolfgang von Trips, Phil Hill, Stirling Moss, and Richie Ginther. Realistically, however, the championship had come down to two Ferrari drivers, von Trips and Hill.

In the Constructors' Championship, two teams were mathematically in contention: Ferrari, and Lotus-Climax. In order for Lotus to overtake Ferrari at this point, one of their drivers had to win both this race and the final race of the season, the 1961 United States Grand Prix.

Qualifying 
37 cars attempted to qualify for the Italian Grand Prix, and 32 had sufficiently fast times to make it to the race grid. Similar to the 107% rule of today, a rule was in place for the 1961 season enforcing a 115% cutoff against the time of the second fastest driver.

Classification

Qualifying

Race

Championship standings after the race

Drivers' Championship standings

Constructors' Championship standings

 Notes: Only the top five positions are included for both sets of standings. Only the best 5 results counted towards the Championship. Numbers without parentheses are Championship points; numbers in parentheses are total points scored.

References

Italian Grand Prix
Italian Grand Prix
1961 in Italian motorsport